The world economy or global economy is the economy of all humans of the world, referring to the global economic system, which includes all economic activities which are conducted both within and between nations, including production, consumption, economic management, work in general, exchange of financial values and trade of goods and services. In some contexts, the two terms are distinct "international" or "global economy" being measured separately and distinguished from national economies, while the "world economy" is simply an aggregate of the separate countries' measurements. Beyond the minimum standard concerning value in production, use and exchange, the definitions, representations, models and valuations of the world economy vary widely. It is inseparable from the geography and ecology of planet Earth.
 
It is common to limit questions of the world economy exclusively to human economic activity, and the world economy is typically judged in monetary terms, even in cases in which there is no efficient market to help valuate certain goods or services, or in cases in which a lack of independent research, genuine data or government cooperation makes establishing figures difficult. Typical examples are illegal drugs and other black market goods, which by any standard are a part of the world economy, but for which there is, by definition, no legal market of any kind.
 
However, even in cases in which there is a clear and efficient market to establish a monetary value, economists do not typically use the current or official exchange rate to translate the monetary units of this market into a single unit for the world economy since exchange rates typically do not closely reflect worldwide value, for example in cases where the volume or price of transactions is closely regulated by the government.

Rather, market valuations in a local currency are typically translated to a single monetary unit using the idea of purchasing power. This is the method used below, which is used for estimating worldwide economic activity in terms of real United States dollars or euros. However, the world economy can be evaluated and expressed in many more ways. It is unclear, for example, how many of the world's 7.8 billion people have most of their economic activity reflected in these valuations.
 
According to Maddison, until the middle of the 19th century, global output was dominated by China and India. Waves of the  Industrial Revolution in Western Europe and Northern America shifted the shares to the Western Hemisphere. As of 2022, the following 18 countries or collectives have reached an economy of at least US$2 trillion by GDP in nominal or PPP terms: Brazil, Canada, China, France, Germany, India, Indonesia, Italy, Japan, South Korea, Mexico, Russia, Saudi Arabia, Spain, Turkey, the United Kingdom, the United States and the European Union.

Despite high levels of government investment, the World Bank predicted that the global economy would decrease by 5.2 percent in 2020. Cities account for 80% of global GDP, thus they would face the brunt of this decline.

Overview

World economy by country groups

Current world economic league table of largest economies in the world by GDP and share of global economic growth

Twenty largest economies in the world by nominal GDP

Twenty largest economies in the world by GDP (PPP)

Statistical indicators

Finance

 GDP (GWP) (gross world product): (purchasing power parity exchange rates) – $59.38 trillion (2005 est.), $51.48 trillion (2004), $23 trillion (2002). The GWP is the combined gross national income of all the countries in the world. When calculating the GWP, add GDP of all countries. Also, GWP shows that imports and exports are equal. Because imports and exports balance exactly when considering the whole world:, this also equals the total global gross domestic product (GDP). According to the World Bank, the 2013 nominal GWP was approximately US$75.59 trillion. In 2017, according to the CIA's World Factbook, the GWP was around US$80.27 trillion in nominal terms and totaled approximately 127.8 trillion international dollars in terms of purchasing power parity (PPP). The per capita PPP GWP in 2017 was approximately Int$17,500 according to the World Factbook.
 GDP (GWP) (gross world product): (market exchange rates) – $60.69 trillion (2008). The market exchange rates increased from 1990 to 2008. The reason for this increase is the world's advancement in terms of technology.
 GDP (real growth rate): The following part shows the GDP growth rate and the expected value after one year.
 Developed Economies. A developed country, industrialized country, more developed country (MDC), or more economically developed country (MEDC), is a sovereign state that has a developed economy and advanced technological infrastructure relative to other less industrialized nations. Most commonly, the criteria for evaluating the degree of economic development are gross domestic product (GDP), gross national product (GNP), the per capita income, level of industrialization, amount of widespread infrastructure and general standard of living. Which criteria are to be used and which countries can be classified as being developed are subjects of debate. The GDP of the developed countries is predicted to fall from 2.2% in 2017 to 2.0% in 2018 due to the fall in dollar value.
 Developing Countries. A developing country is a country with a less developed industrial base (industries) and a low Human Development Index (HDI) relative to other countries. However, this definition is not universally agreed upon. There is also no clear agreement on which countries fit this category. A nation's GDP per capita, compared with other nations, can also be a reference point. In general, the United Nations accepts any country's claim of itself being "developing". The GDP of the developing countries is expected to rise from 4.3% in 2017 to 4.6% in 2018 due to political stability in those countries and advancement in technology.
 Least developed countries. The least developed countries (LDCs) is a list of developing countries that, according to the United Nations, exhibit the lowest indicators of socioeconomic development, with the lowest Human Development Index ratings of all countries in the world. The concept of LDCs originated in the late 1960s and the first group of LDCs was listed by the UN in its resolution 2768 (XXVI) of 18 November 1971. This is a group of countries that are expected to improve their GDP from 4.8% in 2017 to 5.4% in 2018. The predicted growth is associated advancement in technology and industrialization of those countries for the past decade.
 GDP – per capita: purchasing power parity – $9,300, €7,500 (2005 est.), $8,200, €6,800 (92) (2003), $7,900, €5,000 (2002)
 World median income: purchasing power parity $1,041, €950 (1993)
 GDP – composition by sector: agriculture: 4%; industry: 32%; services: 64% (2004 est.)
 Inflation rate (consumer prices); In economics, inflation is a general rise in the price level in an economy over a period of time, resulting in a sustained drop in the purchasing power of money. When the general price level rises, each unit of currency buys fewer goods and services; consequently, inflation reflects a reduction in the purchasing power per unit of money – a loss of real value in the medium of exchange and unit of account within the economy. The opposite of inflation is deflation, a sustained decrease in the general price level of goods and services. The common measure of inflation is the inflation rate, the annualized percentage change in a general price index, usually the consumer price index, over time. national inflation rates vary widely in individual cases, from declining prices in Japan to hyperinflation (In economics, hyperinflation is very high and typically accelerating inflation) in several Third World countries (2003): 
 World 2.6% (2017), 2.8% (predicted 2018); 
 Developed Economies 1% to 4% typically
 Developing Countries 5% to 60% typically
 Least developed countries 11.4% (2017), 8.3% (predicted 2018)
 Derivatives OTC outstanding notional amount: $601 trillion (Dec 2010)
 Derivatives exchange traded outstanding notional amount: $82 trillion (June 2011)
 Global debt issuance: $5.187 trillion, €3 trillion (2004), $4.938 trillion, €3.98 trillion (2003), $3.938 trillion (2002) (Thomson Financial League Tables)
 Global equity issuance: $505 billion, €450 billion (2004), $388 billion. €320 billion (2003), $319 billion, €250 trillion (2002) (Thomson Financial League Tables)

Employment

 Unemployment rate: 8.7% (2009 est.). 30% (2007 est.) combined unemployment and underemployment in many non-industrialized countries; developed countries typically 4%–12% unemployment.

Industries
 Industrial production growth rate: 3% (2002 est.)

Energy

 Yearly electricity – production: 21,080,878 GWh (2011 est.), 15,850,000 GWh (2003 est.), 14,850,000 GWh (2001 est.)
 Yearly electricity – consumption: 14,280,000 GWh (2003 est.), 13,930,000 GWh (2001 est.)
 Oil – production:  (2003 est.),  (2001)
 Oil – consumption:  (2003 est.),  (2001)
 Oil – proved reserves: 1.025 trillion barrel ( (2001 est.)
 Natural gas – production:  (2012 est.),  (2001 est.)
 Natural gas – consumption:  (2001 est.)
 Natural gas – proved reserves:  (1 January 2002)

Cross-border
 Yearly exports: $12.4 trillion, €11.05 trillion (2009 est.)
 Exports – commodities: the whole range of industrial and agricultural goods and services
 Exports – partners: US 12.7%, Germany 7.1%, China 6.2%, France 4.4%, Japan 4.2%, UK 4.1% (2008)
 Yearly imports: $12.29 trillion, €10.95 trillion (2009 est.)
 Imports – commodities: the whole range of industrial and agricultural goods and services
 Imports – partners: China 10.3%, Germany 8.6%, US 8.1%, Japan 5% (2008)
 Debt – external: $56.9 trillion, €40 trillion (31 December 2009 est.)

Gift economy
 Yearly economic aid – recipient: net Official Development Assistance (ODA) of $135.2 billion (2014)

Communications
Telephones – main lines in use: 843,923,500 (2007)4,263,367,600 (2008)
 Telephones – mobile cellular: 3,300,000,000 (Nov. 2007)
 Internet Service Providers (ISPs): 10,350 (2000 est.)
 Internet users: 3,079,339,857 (31 December 2014 ), 360,985,492 (31 December 2000)

Transport

Transportation infrastructure worldwide includes:
 Airports
 Total: 41,821 (2013)
 Roadways 
 Total: 
 Paved: 
 Unpaved:  (2002)
 Railways

Military

 World military expenditure in 2018: estimated to $1.822 trillion
 Military expenditures – percent of GDP: roughly 2% of gross world product (1999).

Science, research and development

The Royal Society in a 2011 report stated that in terms of number of papers the share of English-language scientific research papers the United States was first followed by China, the UK, Germany, Japan, France, and Canada. In 2015, research and development constituted an average 2.2% of the global GDP according to the UNESCO Institute for Statistics. Metrics and rankings of innovation include the Bloomberg Innovation Index, the Global Innovation Index and the share of Nobel laureates per capita.

Resources and environment

 Forests (carbon sinks, wood, ecosystem services, ...)
 Estimated number of trees that are net lost annually as of 2021: 10 billion
 Global annual deforested land in 2015–2020: 10 million hectares
 Global annual net forest area loss in 2000–2010 : 4.7 million hectares
 Other land degradation and land- and organisms-related ecosystem disturbances
 Soils (carbon sink, ecosystem services, food production, ...)
 Soil erosion by water in 2012: almost 36 billion tons (based on a high resolution global potential soil erosion model developed in 2017)
 Estimated annual loss of agricultural productivity due to soil erosion: 8 billion US dollars (based on the soil erosion data)
 Soil erosion by water in 2015: approximately 43 billion tons (according to a 2020 study)
 Environmental impact of pesticides
 Pesticide use in tonnes of active ingredient in Australia in 2016: ca. 62,500 tonnes
 Oceans (ecosystem services, food production, ...): Blue economy
 Waste and pollution (effects of economic mechanisms, effects on ecosystem services)
 As of 2018, about 380 million tonnes of plastic is produced worldwide each year. From the 1950s up to 2018, an estimated 6.3 billion tonnes of plastic has been produced worldwide, of which an estimated 9% has been recycled and another 12% has been incinerated with the rest reportedly being "dumped in landfills or the natural environment".
 Air pollution
 Number of human deaths caused annually by air pollution worldwide: ca. 7 million
 Estimated global annual cost of air pollution: $5 trillion
 Microplastic pollution
 Estimated accumulated number of microplastic particles in the North Atlantic Ocean in 2014: 15 to 51 trillion particles, weighing between 93,000 and 236,000 metric tons
 Estimated accumulated number of microplastic particles in the North Atlantic Ocean in 2020: 3700 microplastics per cubic meter

From the scientific perspective, economic activities are embedded in a web of dynamic, interrelated, and interdependent activities that constitute the natural system of Earth. Novel application of cybernetics in decision-making (such as in decision-making related to process- and product-design and related laws) and direction of human activity (such as economic activity) may make it easier to control modern ecological problems.

Historical development 

One example for a comparable metric other than GDP are the OECD Better Life Index rankings for different aggregative domains.

The index includes 11 comparable "dimensions" of well-being:
Housing: housing conditions and spendings (e.g. real estate pricing)
Income: household income (after taxes and transfers) and net financial wealth
Jobs: earnings, job security and unemployment
Community: quality of social support network
Education: education and what one gets out of it
Environment: quality of environment (e.g. environmental health)
Governance: involvement in democracy
Health
Life Satisfaction: level of happiness
Safety: murder and assault rates
Work-life balance

Economic studies 
To promote exports, many government agencies publish on the web economic studies by sector and country. Among these agencies include the USCS (US DoC) and FAS (USDA) in the United States, the EDC and AAFC in Canada, Ubifrance in France, the UKTI in the United Kingdom, the HKTDC and JETRO in Asia, Austrade and the NZTE in Oceania. Through Partnership Agreements, the Federation of International Trade Associations publishes studies from several of these agencies (USCS, FAS, AAFC, UKTI, and HKTDC) as well as other non-governmental organizations on its website globaltrade.net.

See also

 Anarchy (international relations)
 Capitalism
 Common Wealth: Economics for a Crowded Planet (book)
 Economic bubble
 Economic collapse
 Emerging and growth-leading economies
 Fourth Industrial Revolution
 Global financial system
 Global workforce
 Globality
 Globalization
 International trade
 Trade route
 Overconsumption
 Petrodollar recycling
 World Trade Report
 World history
 Economic history of the world
 World-systems theory

Regional economies:

 Economy of Africa
 Economy of Asia
 Economy of Europe
 Economy of North America
 Economy of Oceania
 Economy of South America

Events:

 Great Recession
 World oil market chronology from 2003
 2007–2008 financial crisis
 2007–2008 world food price crisis
 Economic impact of the COVID-19 pandemic

Lists:

 List of countries by GDP sector composition
 List of world's largest economies (nominal) – based on current currency market exchange rates
 List of world's largest economies (PPP) – based on purchasing power parity
 Historical list of world's largest economies (PPP) – for the years between 1 and 1998

References

External links

 OECD – Economic Outlook
 US Bureau of Labor and Statistics, Major Economic Indicators
 IMF – World Economic Outlook
 UN DESA – World Economy publications
 CIA – The World Factbook – World
 Career Education for a Global Economy
 BBC News Special Report – Global Economy
 Guardian Special Report – Global Economy
 World Bank Summary Trade Statistics for World

 
Economics catchphrases
Economic globalization